This is a list of nature centers and environmental education centers in the state of Wisconsin.

Defunct centers
 Myrick Hixon EcoPark, La Crosse, closed in 2014

References

 Wisconsin Online - Wisconsin Nature and Environmental Education Centers

External links
 Map of nature center and environmental education centers in Wisconsin

 
Nature centers
Wisconsin